Hamad Al-Juhaim (born October 12, 1987) is a Saudi professional footballer who plays for Al-Jabalain as a forward.

On 18 June 2022, Al-Juhaim joined Al-Jabalain.

References

External links 
 

1987 births
Living people
Saudi Arabian footballers
People from Ha'il
Association football forwards
Al-Tai FC players
Al-Raed FC players
Al-Fateh SC players
Al-Fayha FC players
Ohod Club players
Al-Jabalain FC players
Saudi First Division League players
Saudi Professional League players